This is the results breakdown of the local elections held in the Basque Country on 24 May 2015. The following tables show detailed results in the autonomous community's most populous municipalities, sorted alphabetically.

Opinion polls

Overall

City control
The following table lists party control in the most populous municipalities, including provincial capitals (shown in bold). Gains for a party are displayed with the cell's background shaded in that party's colour.

Municipalities

Barakaldo
Population: 100,080

Basauri
Population: 41,624

Bilbao
Population: 346,574

Donostia-San Sebastián
Population: 186,126

Errenteria
Population: 39,230

Getxo
Population: 79,544

Irun
Population: 61,195

Portugalete
Population: 47,117

Santurtzi
Population: 46,651

Vitoria-Gasteiz
Population: 242,082

Juntas Generales

References

Basque Country
2015